Pietra Ligure is a comune (municipality) in the Province of Savona in the Italian region Liguria, located about  southwest of Genoa and about  southwest of Savona. It is mainly a touristic city.

Pietra Ligure borders the following municipalities: Bardineto, Boissano, Borgio Verezzi, Giustenice, Loano, and Tovo San Giacomo.

Twin towns — sister cities
Pietra Ligure is twinned with:

  Offenburg, Germany, since 2007

References

External links
 Official website

Cities and towns in Liguria